Hydroxyacetylaminofluorene is a derivative of 2-acetylaminofluorene used as a biochemical tool in the study of carcinogenesis.

See also
 Acetoxyacetylaminofluorene

Carcinogens